The Midlands Comedy Awards are an annual awards ceremony for live comedy performers and comedy clubs based in The Midlands region of England. It also recognises achievement in online comedy. They were founded in 2014 and give out awards in eleven categories every year.

History 
The Midlands Comedy Awards were created by Birmingham-based comedian Jay Shareef in 2014, "to recognise the huge number of hard working and talented people in [the] regional comedy community".

Rules and eligibility 
The finalists for the awards are chosen by comedy clubs and media professionals from the Midlands region, and only comedians and comedy clubs based in either the East Midlands or West Midlands qualify. This means that comedians resident in The Midlands are eligible even if they are originally from elsewhere. The awards include the following counties in their definition of the Midlands region: Cambridgeshire, Derbyshire, Herefordshire, Leicestershire, Lincolnshire, Nottinghamshire, Northamptonshire, Rutland, Shropshire, Staffordshire, Warwickshire, West Midlands and Worcestershire.

Before Brexit, the awards accepted the definition of East Midlands and West Midlands as the areas represented in the European Parliament by those constituencies.

Winners

2021

Best Act
Winner – Scott Bennett
Runner up – Stevie Gray
Third place – Josh Pugh
Best MC
Winner – Jon Pearson
Runner up – Barry Dodds
Third place – Tommy Tomski
Breakthrough Act
Winner – Tal Davies
Runner up – Eric Rushton
Third place – Kevin Daniel
Best New Act
Winner – Ricky Balshaw
Runner up – Josh Reynolds
Third place – Leanne Easthope
Alternative Act
Winner – Good Kids
Runner up – The Boys From The All Night Chemist
Third place – Richard Dadd
Best Live Show
Winner – Scott Bennett - Relax 
Runner up – Jon Pearson - What Have You Been Up To?
Third place – Richard Dadd - Tea With The Devil
Online Comedy
Winner – Jack Kirwan
Runner up – Scott Bennett
Third place – Mary Flanigan
Best Comedy Club
Winner – Hollywood Comedy Club
Runner up – The Glee Club
Third place – Funhouse Comedy
Best Small Club
Winner – NCF
Runner up – The Holly Bush
Third place – RockCentral
Best Open Mic Show
Winner – The Holly Bush
Runner up – Canal House (NCF)
Third place – Kamikaze Club
Outstanding Contribution
Geoff Rowe (Leicester Comedy Festival)

2020

The awards did not take place due to the COVID-19 pandemic.

2019

Best Act
Winner – Scott Bennett
Runner up – Josh Pugh
Best MC
Winners (joint) – Chris Oxenbury and Tommy Tomski
Third Place (joint) – Barry Dodds and James Cook
Rising Star
Winner – Douglas Carter
Runner up – Celya AB
Best New Act
Winner – Lovell Smith
Runner up – Tal Davies
Alternative Act
Winners (joint) – Good Kids and Donald Mackerel
Third Place – Roger Swift
Best Live Show
Winner – Josh Pugh 
Runners up (joint) – Parapod Live and Thomas Green
Online Comedy
Winner – Jack Kirwan
Runner up – Katy Trev
Best Comedy Club
Winner – The Glee Club
Runner up – NCF
Best Small Club
Winner – Ofton Funny
Runners up (joint) – Cherrybomb Comedy, The Kamikaze Club and The Holly Bush
Best Open Mic Show
Winner – Useful Idiot
Runner up – NCF £1 Night

2018

Best Act
Winner – Scott Bennett
Runner up – Josh Pugh
Best MC
Winner – Barry Dodds
Runner up – Jason Neale
Best New Act
Winner – Douglas Carter
Runner up – Donald Mackerel
Best Live Show
Winner – Scott Bennett: Leap Year
Runner up – Laura Monmoth: LGBTQZX
Best Comedy Club
Winner – The Glee Club
Runner up – Funhouse Comedy
Best Small Club
Winner – NCF
Runner up – The Holly Bush

2017

Best Act
Winner – Joe Lycett
Runner up – Luisa Omielan
Third place – Rob Kemp
Best MC
Winner – Barry Dodds
Runner up – Gareth Berliner
Third place – Stevie Gray
Breakthrough Act
Winner – Rob Kemp
Runner up – Pete Teckman
Third place – Jack Kirwan and Sarah Johnson (joint)
Best New Act
Winner – Jem Braithwaite
Runner up – Gina Overton
Third place – Count Evil
Best Alternative Act
Winner – Rob Kemp
Runner up – Jack Kirwan
Third place – Andrew McBurney
Best Live Show
Winner – Rob Kemp
Runner up – Josh Pugh
Third place – Phil Pagett
Online Comedy
Winner – Jack Kirwan
Runner up – Masai Graham
Third place – Craig Deeley
Best Comedy Club
Winner – The Glee Club
Runner up – Funhouse Comedy
Third place – Laff Attack
Best Small Club
Winner – Funhouse Comedy
Runner up – FAF Comedy
Third place – CAN Comedy and Blue Giraffe (joint)
Best Open Mic Show
Winner –  The Holly Bush (Cradley Heath)
Runner up – Comedy and Cocktails (Leicester)
Third place – NCF £1 Comedy Night (Nottingham)
Outstanding Contribution
Winner – Spiky Mike (Funhouse Comedy)

2016

Best Act
Winner – Duncan Oakley
Runner up – Masai Graham
Third place – Scott Bennett
Best MC
Winner – Barry Dodds
Runner up – Gareth Berliner
Third place – Jon Pearson and Wayne Beese (joint)
Best Live Show
Winner – Late Night with Boabby Roaster
Runner up – I Came, I Saw, I Complained
Third place – Hell To Play
Breakthrough Act
Winner – Masai Graham
Runner up – Alex Hylton
Third place – Josh Pugh
Best New Act
Winner – Moses Ali Khan
Runner up – Sarah Johnson
Third place – Harvey Hawkins
Alternative Act
Winner – Paul Palmer
Runner up – Andrew McBurney
Third place – Daniel Nicholas
Online Comedy
Winner – The Parapod
Runner up – Jack Kirwan
Third place – Masai Graham
Best Comedy Club
Winner – Funhouse Comedy
Runner up – The Glee Club
Third place – Fitz of Laughter
Best Small Club
Winner – FAF Comedy
Runner up – Blue Giraffe Comedy
Third place – Fitz of Laughter
Best Open Mic Show
Winner –  NCF Canal House
Runner up – The Holly Bush
Third place – Roadhouse Comedy
Outstanding Contribution
Winner – Bushfest

2015

Best Act
Winner – Tom Binns
Runner up – Barbara Nice
Third place – Andy White
Best MC
Winner – Barry Dodds
Runner up – Andy Robinson
Third place – Jason Neale
Best Live Show
Winner – Scott Bennett
Runner up – Masai Graham
Third place – Jon Pearson
Breakthrough Act
Winner – Lucy Thompson
Runner up – Masai Graham
Third place – Patrick Draper
Best New Act
Winner – Josh Pugh
Runner up – Stu Woodings
Third place – Thomas Rackham
Alternative Act
Winner – Roger Swift
Runner up – Johnny Sorrow
Third place – Daniel Nicholas
Online Comedy
Winner – Masai Graham
Runner up – Club Smashing
Third place – Mike O'Callaghan
Best Comedy Club
Winner – Voodoo Stands Up (Stamford)
Runner up – CAN Comedy (Black Country)
Best Small Club
Winner – Funhouse Comedy
Runner up – FAF Comedy
Best Open Mic Show
Winner – The Holly Bush (Cradley Heath)
Runner up – Roadhouse Comedy (Birmingham)
Third place – NCF Canal House (Nottingham)
Outstanding Contribution
Winner – Suzanne Rowland

2014 

Best Act
Winner – Andy Robinson
Runner up – Masai Graham
Best Compere
Winner – Andy Robinson
Runner up – Dave Dinsdale
Breakthrough Act
Winner – Hannah Silvester
Runner up – Daniel Nicholas
Best New Act
Winner – Tom Christian and Josh Pugh (joint winners)
Runner up – Lucy Thompson
Best Comedy Club
Winner – The Glee Club
Runner up – CAN Comedy
Best Open Mic Show
Winner – Fowl Humour
Runner up – The Holly Bush
Outstanding Contribution
Winner – Roger Swift

References

External links 
 Midlands Comedy Awards official site

British comedy and humour awards